Seymur Mammadov (born on 29 May 2003) is an Azerbaijani professional footballer who plays as a midfielder for Sabah in the Azerbaijan Premier League.

Career

Club
On 28 August 2022, Mammadov made his debut in the Azerbaijan Premier League for Sabah against Gabala.

References

External links
 

2003 births
Living people
Association football midfielders
Azerbaijani footballers
Azerbaijan Premier League players
Sabah FC (Azerbaijan) players